The Lithuanian A Lyga 2004 was the 15th season of top-tier football in Lithuania. The season started on 18 April 2004 and ended on 7 November 2004. 8 teams participated with FBK Kaunas winning the championship.

League standings

Results

First half of season

Second half of season

See also 
 2004 LFF Lyga

References 

LFF Lyga seasons
1
Lith
Lith